Nikita ("Niki") Palli (born 28 May 1987 in Moldova) is an Israeli athlete competing in the high jump.

Biography
At the age of 8, Niki Palli moved with his family from Moldova to Israel. In 2005 Palli became an Israeli citizen.

Sports career
In 2005, Palli improved his personal best from 2.09 to 2.25 meters and became Israeli champion in high jump.

At the 2006 European Athletics Championships in Gothenburg he finished sixth, after achieving 2.27 meters. At the 2006 World Junior Championships in Beijing he finished 2nd, jumping 2.29 meters. His current personal best is 2.30 meters, achieved on July 12, 2006, in the 2006 Israel athletics championships in Tel Aviv. This is the Israeli junior record and second-best performance for an Israeli high jumper. The record is held by Konstantin Matusevich with 2.36 meters.

At the 2007 European Athletics Indoor Championships he finished eighth and last in the final, only clearing 2.15 metres.

He cleared a season best 2.27 meters twice in July and qualified for 2008 Summer Olympics.

He competed on behalf of Israel at the 2008 Summer Olympics in Beijing, China.

He tied for the silver medal in the high jump at the 2017 Maccabiah Games, jumping 2.05 meters.

See also
Sports in Israel

References

External links
 

1987 births
Living people
Moldovan emigrants to Israel
Israeli male high jumpers
Athletes (track and field) at the 2008 Summer Olympics
Olympic athletes of Israel
Israeli people of Moldovan descent
Maccabiah Games medalists in athletics